The January 2013 Southeastern United States floods occurred from January 14 to 17, and resulted in mudslides and washouts throughout the southern Appalachian Mountains region. At the height of the flooding, 50 roads were declared impassable in Greene County, Tennessee alone. A similar storm system brought more flooding rain to the region from January 27 to 31.

Closure of U.S. Route 441
As a result of the heavy rainfall, a January 16 landslide claimed a 200-feet section of U.S. Route 441 (known locally as "Newfound Gap Road") in Great Smoky Mountains National Park in North Carolina. The road, which crosses Newfound Gap at the Tennessee state line, was closed until April 15.

See also
2009 Southeastern United States floods, which caused major rockslides in the southern Appalachians
July 2013 Southeastern United States floods

External links
Video report on the Newfound Gap Road landslide, from the Knoxville News Sentinel
Video report on the Newfound Gap Road landslide, from WLOS-TV Asheville
Video report on the Newfound Gap Road landslide, from the Asheville Citizen-Times
Video report on the Newfound Gap Road landslide repair work, from WLOS
Video report on the reopening of Newfound Gap Road, from WLOS
Video report on the flooding in Johnson County, Tennessee, from local news WYMT-TV
Amateur video of the flooding and its impacts in Johnson County, Tennessee

References

2013 floods in the United States
2013 in Alabama
2013 in Georgia (U.S. state)
2013 in Kentucky
2013 in Mississippi
2013 in North Carolina
2013 in South Carolina
2013 in Tennessee
2013 in Virginia
2013 Southeastern United States floods
Great Smoky Mountains
Great Smoky Mountains National Park
2013 Southeastern United States floods